Schwarzlose may refer to:

Firearms
Schwarzlose MG M.07/12, an Austro-Hungarian medium machine gun
Schwarzlose Model 1898, a German semi-automatic pistol
Schwarzlose Model 1908, a German semi-automatic pistol featuring a "blow-forward" action

People
Andreas Wilhelm Schwarzlose (1867-1936), a Prussian firearms designer